FK Baltija Panevėžys was a Lithuanian football team which played two seasons in the I Lyga in 2013 and 2014. The club withdrew from the competition after the creation of FK Panevėžys.

References

Defunct football clubs in Lithuania
Association football clubs disestablished in 2015